Zănoguța River may refer to:
 Zănoguța, a tributary of the Judele in Hunedoara County, Romania
 Zănoguța, a tributary of the Latorița in Vâlcea County, Romania
 Zănoguța, a tributary of the Vâlsan in Argeș County, Romania